NH 153 may refer to:

 National Highway 153 (India)
 New Hampshire Route 153, United States